Joseph Wilford Booth (1866–1928) was a prominent missionary of The Church of Jesus Christ of Latter-day Saints and educator in the early 20th-century.

Booth was born in Alpine, Utah Territory. He attended Brigham Young Academy, he then became a school teacher. He married Mary Rebecca "Reba" Moyle in the Logan Utah Temple in 1890. Booth served his first mission to the Ottoman Empire from 1898 until 1902. He returned as a missionary in 1903, this time accompanied by his wife. He was later mission president there from 1904 until 1909. He tried to start missionary work in Greece in 1905. After returning to Utah he resumed his work as a school teacher.

Booth again served as mission president starting in 1921, although the mission headquarters were later moved to Syria. His wife did not join him until 1924. Most of those who converted to Mormonism were Armenians, although some Greeks and Arabs were also converted. He died while serving as mission president in 1928.

In 1925, Booth wrote a book entitled Come Listen to A Prophet's Voice.

References
Daniel F. Boone, "J. Wilford Booth" in Arnold K. Garr, et al., ed. The Encyclopedia of Latter-day Saint History (Salt Lake City: Deseret Book, 2000), p. 124.
BYU missionary diaries bio of Booth

External links
Joseph wilford Booth's diary from at L. Tom Perry Special Collections, Brigham Young University

1866 births
1928 deaths
American leaders of the Church of Jesus Christ of Latter-day Saints
American Mormon missionaries in Syria
Brigham Young Academy alumni
19th-century Mormon missionaries
20th-century Mormon missionaries
American Mormon missionaries in Greece
Mission presidents (LDS Church)
People from Alpine, Utah
American expatriates in the Ottoman Empire
Mormon missionaries in the Ottoman Empire
Latter Day Saints from Utah